The 1931 Liège–Bastogne–Liège was the 21st edition of the Liège–Bastogne–Liège cycle race and was held on 9 June 1931. The race started and finished in Liège. The race was won by Alphonse Schepers.

General classification

References

1931
1931 in Belgian sport